Kurt Pratsch-Kaufmann (1906–1988) was a German stage, television and film actor. He was married to the actress Marianne Pohlenz.

Selected filmography
 The Black Forest Girl (1950)
 Queen of the Night (1951)
 The Heath Is Green (1951)
 Mikosch Comes In (1952)
 We'll Talk About Love Later (1953)
 When The Village Music Plays on Sunday Nights (1953)
 The Cousin from Nowhere (1953)
 Ball at the Savoy (1955)
 One Woman Is Not Enough? (1955)
 Kindermädchen für Papa gesucht (1957)
 The Big Chance (1957)
 Victor and Victoria (1957)
 The Blue Sea and You (1959)
 Every Day Isn't Sunday (1959)
 What a Woman Dreams of in Springtime (1959)
 The Last Pedestrian (1960)
 Marina (1960)
 Robert and Bertram (1961)
 Auf Wiedersehen (1961)
 Café Oriental (1962)

References

Bibliography
 Peter Cowie & Derek Elley. World Filmography: 1968. Tantivy Press, 1968

External links

1906 births
1988 deaths
German male film actors
German male television actors
Actors from Dresden